The Knebworth Festival 1979 consisted of two concerts performed by the English rock band Led Zeppelin and other artists at Knebworth House, Hertfordshire, England, in August 1979.

History
The grounds of Knebworth House near the village of Knebworth had been a major venue for open air rock and pop concerts since 1974. In 1979, veteran promoter Freddy Bannister booked Led Zeppelin to play that year's concerts which took place on 4 August and 11 August after the bandleader of the Electric Light Orchestra, Jeff Lynne, turned down the offer to headline the festival.

Led Zeppelin had not performed live for two years, since the death of Robert Plant's son during the band's 1977 North American tour, and they had not performed in the United Kingdom for four years. Their manager Peter Grant decided that the band should perform at Knebworth instead of embarking on a lengthy tour, as explained by Dave Lewis:

The band's fee for performing was reportedly the largest ever paid to one single act at that time.

In the lead-up to the concerts Led Zeppelin undertook extensive rehearsals at Bray Film studios near London, and attended the venue at Knebworth in order to inspect the site, complete a publicity photograph shoot and perform a soundcheck. In addition, they performed two low-key warm-up shows in late July at the Falkoner Theatre, Copenhagen, Denmark.

Also performing at the Knebworth concerts in 1979 were The New Barbarians, featuring Ronnie Wood and Keith Richards (The New Barbarians played only at the second concert on August 11); Todd Rundgren and Utopia; Southside Johnny; Marshall Tucker; Commander Cody; Chas & Dave; and Fairport Convention.

According to the official website of Knebworth House, the 1979 Knebworth Festival involved:

These were amongst the largest crowds to which Led Zeppelin had ever performed. Lewis writes:

Similarly, music journalist Chris Welch has observed that the audiences "included a whole new generation who had never seen Led Zeppelin in their prime."

Critical reaction
The concerts received decidedly mixed reviews. Although Record Mirror and Melody Maker provided generally positive reports, journalists from other major music publications such as New Musical Express, Sounds, Rolling Stone and The Sunday Times criticized Led Zeppelin's performances as being sluggish and rusty. With such a long layoff since their last performances in Britain, and in the wake of the punk rock revolution, Led Zeppelin were now considered to be obsolete in some quarters.

The negative reviews prompted the ire of Robert Plant, who made sarcastic reference to them on-stage during the 11 August show. However, Plant himself later expressed reservations about the concerts:

In an interview he gave in 2005, Plant elaborated:

Led Zeppelin's manager Peter Grant stated after the event that Led Zeppelin's performance at Knebworth was "a bit rusty". In the opinion of Lewis the gigs were a "nervous, rather tentative attempt [by Led Zeppelin] to step back into the limelight ... Some of it was breathtaking, some musically woefully inept and sometimes it wavered between the two in the space of a few minutes." Welch, who also attended the concerts, similarly suggests that:

Audio and video recordings
The two concerts were professionally recorded on the Rolling Stones Mobile Studio (engineered by George Chkiantz) and also videotaped, with live images beamed directly onto a giant screen behind the stage. The video was done by the TV International company under the direction of Chris Bodger. There was a plan for the footage to be used on a television special (this is one of the reasons the band members wore the same clothes on both nights) but this idea was never realised. Only short clips of some of the songs were used by Atlantic Records for promotional purposes.

For many years, bootleg copies of this audio and video material circulated amongst fans. The first audience-recorded bootlegs became available in early 1980. However, aside from the promotional snippets, Led Zeppelin never officially released any of the recordings until 2003, when parts of the footage were digitally remastered and included on the Led Zeppelin DVD.

Set list
Two songs from the band's eighth and most recent studio album In Through the Out Door were played for the first time on stage, namely "Hot Dog" and "In the Evening". The album was intended to be released prior to the band's concerts, but production delays pushed its release date to shortly after the event. Plant jokingly referred to the delays at times during the performance on 4 August.

All tracks written by Jimmy Page and Robert Plant, except where noted.

The band's set list was as follows:

"The Song Remains the Same"
"Celebration Day" (Jones, Page, Plant)
"Out on the Tiles" (intro) (Bonham, Page, Plant) / "Black Dog" (Jones, Page, Plant)
"Nobody's Fault but Mine"
"Over the Hills and Far Away"
"Misty Mountain Hop" (Jones, Page, Plant)
"Since I've Been Loving You" (Jones, Page, Plant) / "Tea for One" (solo)
"No Quarter" (Jones, Page, Plant)
"Ten Years Gone" (on 24 July and 4 August only)
"Hot Dog"
"The Rain Song"
"White Summer" / "Black Mountain Side" (Page)
"Kashmir" (Bonham, Page, Plant)
"Trampled Under Foot" (Jones, Page, Plant)
"Sick Again" (added on 24 July)
"Achilles Last Stand"
"JP solo" (Page)
"In the Evening" (Jones, Page, Plant)
"Stairway to Heaven"

Encore
"Rock and Roll" (Bonham, Jones, Page, Plant) (played on 23 July, 4 August, and 11 August)
"Whole Lotta Love" (Bonham, Dixon, Jones, Page, Plant) (played on 24 July, 4 August, and 11 August)
"Heartbreaker" (Bonham, Jones, Page, Plant) (on 4 August only)
"Communication Breakdown" (Bonham, Jones, Page) (on 11 August only)

Dates

Dispute with Freddy Bannister
Following the event, a dispute arose between Grant and Bannister about the attendance figures at the event. A query by Grant over ticket sales for the concerts resulted in him sending aerial pictures of the crowd to a monitoring laboratory in Nassau, New York, in order to establish the extent of the attendance. He claimed that some 218,000 people were at the first concert and 187,000 at the second. However, the license was for only 100,000 and Bannister claimed that only 104,000 had attended in the first week. For the second show, Grant brought in his own staff to man turnstiles and count tickets.

This disagreement eventually forced Bannister's concert promotion company into liquidation, which allegedly left unpaid bills of £50,000 for the police and £2,000 to the local borough council.

References

Sources
Lewis, Dave and Pallett, Simon (1997) Led Zeppelin: The Concert File, London: Omnibus Press. .

External links
 Article about the event, with photos
 Led Zeppelin Knebworth Programme 1979
Comprehensive archive of known concert appearances by Led Zeppelin (official website)
Led Zeppelin concert setlists

Led Zeppelin concert tours
1979 concert tours
1970s in Hertfordshire
1979 in England
August 1979 events in the United Kingdom
Festival 1979
Concerts in the United Kingdom